Oto Horvat (born 1967) is a Serbian poet and writer. He lives and works in Florence, Italy.

Recent activity
In 2017, Oto Horvat has signed the Declaration on the Common Language of the Croats, Serbs, Bosniaks and Montenegrins.

Works
 Gde nestaje šuma (KZNS, Novi Sad, 1987, Branko Award)
 Zgrušavanje (Matica srpska, Novi Sad, 1990)
 Gorki listovi (Bratstvo Jedinstvo, Novi Sad, 1990)
 Fotografije (Prometej, Novi Sad, 1996)
 Canada. Gedichte (Verlag Bernhard Martin, Fuhrt (Bay), 1999)
 Dozvola za boravak (Narodna knjiga, Beograd, 2002)
 Putovati u Olmo (Narodna biblioteka Stefan Prvovenčani, Kraljevo, 2008)
 Izabrane & nove pesme (Kulturni centar Novog Sada, Novi Sad, 2009)
 Sabo je stao (Agora, Novi Sad, 2014)
 Kao Celanovi ljubavnici (Akademska knjiga, Novi Sad, 2016)
 Noćna projekcija (Akademska knjiga, Novi Sad, 2021)

His poems are represented in the anthologies Zvezde su lepe, ali nemam kad da ih gledam. Antologija srpske urbane poezije. Ed. Radmila Lazić (Beograd Samizdat B92); Die Neuen Mieter. Fremde Blick auf ein vertrautes Land, Ed. I. Mickiewicz (Berlin, Aufbau Taschenbuch Verlag, 2004) and Crtež koji kaplje. Vojvodina's new yearbook poetry Ed. S. Radonjic, (To jest, Novi Sad, 1988).

For Sabo je stao Horvat was shortlisted for the Nin prize in 2015, his novel won Biljana Jovanović and Mirko Kovač literary prizes in 2015.

Translations
 Janoš Pilinski, Krater. Selected Poems (JMMT Forum, Novi Sad, 1992)
 Oto Fenjveši, Anđeo haosa. Selected Poems (Prometheus, Novi Sad, 2009)
 Hans Magnus Encensberger, Poslednji pozdrav astronautima. Selected Poems (Agora, Zrenjanin, 2010)

References

1967 births
Living people
Serbian male poets
Signatories of the Declaration on the Common Language
German–Serbian translators
Hungarian–Serbian translators
Italian–Serbian translators